The Battle of the Holme took place in East Anglia on 13 December 902 where the Anglo-Saxon men of Wessex and Kent fought against the Danelaw and East Anglian Danes. Its location is unknown but may have been Holme in Huntingdonshire (now administratively part of Cambridgeshire).

Following the death of Alfred the Great in 899, his son Edward the Elder became king, but his cousin Æthelwold, the son of Alfred's elder brother, King Æthelred, claimed the throne. His bid was unsuccessful, and he fled to the Northumbrian Danes, who, according to one version of the Anglo-Saxon Chronicle, accepted him as king. In 902 Æthelwold came with a fleet to Essex and the following year he persuaded the East Anglian Danes to attack Mercia and north Wessex. Edward retaliated by ravaging East Anglia and the Danish army was forced to return to defend its own territory. Edward then retreated, but the men of Kent disobeyed the order to retire, and they met the Danes at the battle of the Holme.

The course of the battle is unknown, but the Danes appear to have won as according to the Anglo-Saxon Chronicle they "kept the place of slaughter". However, they suffered heavy losses including Æthelwold, Eohric, probably the Danish king of East Anglia, Brihtsige, son of the ætheling Beornoth, and two holds, Ysopa and Oscetel. The battle thus ended Æthelwold's Revolt. Kentish losses included Sigehelm, father of Edward the Elder's third wife, Eadgifu of Kent. The West Saxon chronicler who gave the fullest account of the battle was at pains to explain why Edward and the rest of the English were not present, as if this had been a subject of criticism.

References

Sources

 
 

Holme 902
Holme 902
the Holme
902
10th century in England